Cratoneuron is a genus of mosses belonging to the family Amblystegiaceae. The genus has a cosmopolitan distribution.

Species
The following species are recognised in the genus Cratoneuron:
 

Cratoneuron commutatovirescens 
Cratoneuron curvicaule 
Cratoneuron drepanocladioides 
Cratoneuron filicinum 
Cratoneuron filicinum 
Cratoneuron formianum 
Cratoneuron formosanum 
Cratoneuron kerguelense 
Cratoneuron latifolium 
Cratoneuron longicostatum 
Cratoneuron mendozense 
Cratoneuron oedogonium 
Cratoneuron punae 
Cratoneuron subcurvicaule 
Cratoneuron sulcatoirrigatum 
Cratoneuron tenerrimum 
Cratoneuron williamsii

References

Amblystegiaceae
Moss genera